The Master of the Gerona Martyrology was a Bohemian painter active at the end of the fourteenth century.  His output is fairly poorly known; some historians have conflated him with either the Master of Ambrass or the Master of the Rajhrad Altarpiece.  This view is not universally accepted, and a number of museums have work believed to be by members of his studio, including pieces of illuminated manuscripts.

RExternal links
Work in the National Gallery of Art

Further reading

Czech painters
Manuscript illuminators
Gerona Martyrology, Master of the
14th-century painters